Enneapterygius similis, known commonly as the black and red triplefin, blacktail triplefin or masked threefin, is a species of triplefin blenny in the genus Enneapterygius. It was described by Ronald Fricke in 1997. This species occurs in the western central Pacific Ocean, from the Ryukyu Islands south through the Philippines, in Sabah, central Indonesia, Shepard Island, New Caledonia and eastern Australia.

References

similis
Fish described in 1997